This page shows the results of the Synchronized Swimming Competition at the 1983 Pan American Games, held from August 14 to August 29, 1983 in Caracas, Venezuela. There were three medal events. After five Pan Am wins in a row the United States was upset in the Women's Team event by Canada.

Solo

Duet

Team

Medal table

References
 Sports 123
 USA Synchro Results

1983
1983 in synchronized swimming
Events at the 1983 Pan American Games